Diana La Cazadora (born January 16, 1978 in Madero, Tamaulipas) is a Mexican female wrestler living in Monterrey Nuevo León. She usually performs in Mexico and worked for Consejo Mundial de Lucha Libre (CMLL) for a number of years but is currently working on the Mexican independent circuit as well as occasionally wrestling in the United States. Her name means "Diana the Huntress" in Spanish and is a reference to the Roman Goddess Diana the Huntress.

Professional wrestling career
Diana La Cazadora began her professional wrestling career in 1997, initially wrestling in the area around her hometown of Monterrey, Nuevo León. At one point she held the Monterrey Woman's Championship. Later she would work for the Lucha Libre Femenil promotion, a promotion that only featured women's wrestling. During her time in LLF she won the LLF Junior Championship as well as the LLF Tag Team Championship, teaming with Nikki Roxx.

During the mid-2000s, she began wrestling for Consejo Mundial de Lucha Libre (CMLL), Mexico's largest and the world's oldest professional wrestling promotion. Since CMLL's women's division was not able to provide her with full-time work, she wrestled a lot around Monterrey as well as working as a traffic reporter for local television. Her job as a motorcycle based traffic reporter caused her to break a leg as she was hit by a car while covering another car accident. That injury kept Diana La Cazadora out of the ring from the end of 2005 til spring 2006.

On April 27, 2007, Diana La Cazadora was one of the participants in a 14-women Torneo cibernetico match that was one of the semi-finals in a tournament for the vacant Mexican National Women's Championship. Diana was eliminated by eventual cibernetico winner Marcela. In June, 2007 Diana began a very intense storyline feud with La Amapola, a storyline that led to a rare female Lucha de Apuesta where both Diana and La Amapola "bet" their hair on the outcome of the match. On June 17, 2007 La Amapola defeated Diana La Cazadora two falls to one, after which Diana's hair was shaved off per. Lucha Libre traditions. The feud with Diana La Cazadora gave La Amapola enough Momentum to capture the CMLL World Women's Championship a few months later.

Diana La Cazadora stopped working for CMLL at some point during 2008, instead she occasionally works on the Mexican Independent circuit, including working one of the early shows for Perros del Mal Producciones on December 16, 2008.

Championships and accomplishments
Lucha Libre Femenil
LLF Junior Championship (1 time)
LLF Tag Team Championship (1 time) - with Nikki Roxx
Mexican independent circuit:
Monterrey Woman's Championship (1 time)

Luchas de Apuestas record

References

External links
Diana La Cazadora

1978 births
Mexican female professional wrestlers
Living people
Professional wrestlers from Tamaulipas
People from Ciudad Madero